Diplo's Revolution is a global-centric electronic dance music satellite channel operated by Sirius XM Radio, broadcasting on Sirius Satellite Radio channel 52, XM Satellite Radio channel 52 and Dish Network channel 6052.

The channel was formerly known as Electric Area (2008–2018) and before that Area (2002–2008 via Sirius) and its XM Radio counterpart The Move (2001–2008). The channel is being programmed by musician/producer/DJ/remixer Diplo and named after his 2013 song "Revolution." The channel made its debut at 9pm (EDT) on March 22, 2018.

Station history

As "Area"/"Electric Area" 
The station was available on Sirius, and at first was called Area 63 due to the channel's position. Later, it was renamed Area 33, again due to the channel's then-new position. Area features some of the world's most renowned DJs such as Tiësto, Armin van Buuren, Dash Berlin, Carl Cox, Erik Morillo, Paul Van Dyk, Benny Benassi, Armand Van Helden, Roger Sanchez, Ferry Corsten, Thomas Gold, Serge Devant, Deep Dish, Annie Mac, Sasha and John Digweed. On June 24, 2008, Area 33 was moved to channel 38 to make room for the move of SIRIUS Disorder (occupying the position is now The Bridge). On November 12, 2008, Area dropped its "38" position on the logo because of the Sirius-XM merger, and replaced The Move on the XM channel lineup.  Most recently, Mediabase delisted the S038-FM channel's playlist, along with co-owned Pop2K; Mediabase would read the station to its Dance panel in January 2014.

On September 12, 2010, the channel was renamed Electric Area to expand its exclusive dance music format.

As "Diplo's Revolution" 
On March 22, 2018 Electric Area was replaced with "Diplo's Revolution". It was announced at the launch that the channel would feature "global, hip-hop, experimental and underground dance culture" aside from the current dance/electronica direction, as well as live sets and live festival broadcasts. The transition also resulted in sister channel BPM incorporating most of the content into its playlist.

As of 2020, Diplo’s Revolution has begun to follow a more Top 40-like approach similar to sister channel BPM, as reflected in its playlists as reported in Billboard’s Dance/Mix Show Airplay and Mediabase’s Dance charts.

Programming 
All Love From NY with DJ Theo
Area with Jonathan Peters
Automatic Static with DJ Icey
The Benny Benassi Show
Call of The Wild with Monstercat
DJ Times Shortlist with Emily Tan
Evolution
Global DJ Broadcast with Markus Schulz
The Flavor The Vibe with StoneBridge
Feel Up Radio with Kream
Groove Radio International with Swedish Egil
Identity with Sander Van Doorn
Jefr Tale presents Club Tales
Jacked with Afrojack
The Juicy Show with Robbie Rivera
LostWorld with George Acosta
Made In Miami with Oscar G
The Mothership with Skrillex
Nocturnal with Matt Darey
Paul Van Dyk's Vonyc Sessions
Steve Porter's Porterhouse
Subterranean with Zoltar
The Cookout
Group Therapy Radio with Above & Beyond
Claude VonStroke presents The Birdhouse
Transitions with John Digweed
IsEveryoneOK with Phantoms
UMF Radio
Wonderland Radio with Alison Wonderland
Playground Radio with Louis the Child
A State Of Trance with Armin van Buuren, also airs on digital channel 736 ("A State of Armin").
Night Service Only Radio with CID

Former Programming 

Major Behavior with The Fat Jewish: Internet star Josh Ostrovsky hosted this weekly show where he interviewed celebrities, invited co-hosts, and played guest mixes. The show aired twice a week from May to September 2018.
Hardwell On Air with Hardwell moved to BPM.
Tiësto's Club Life: Moved to BPM once Tiesto shortened the show from 2 hours to 1 hour.
Carl Cox: Global: Carl Cox ended the show in 2017.
Corsten's Countdown with Ferry Corsten: Ended the show in 2020

Availability 
As Electric Area, it was carried on DirecTV until February 9, 2010.  On May 5, 2011, it was moved to channel 52 for both services and Dish Network 6052.

Former Logos

Core artists
Diplo
DJ Snake
Chris Lake
AlunaGeorge
Major Lazer
MK
Skillrex
Dillon Francis

References

See also 
List of Sirius Satellite Radio stations
List of XM Satellite Radio channels

Sirius Satellite Radio channels
XM Satellite Radio channels
Electronic dance music radio stations
Sirius XM Radio channels
Radio stations established in 2008